The Boys Home Internationals was an amateur team golf championship for boys between the four Home Nations. Ireland was represented by the whole island of Ireland.The event was organised by The R&A. The inaugural event was held in 1985 and the venue cycled between the four nations. The winning team received the R&A Trophy. Originally it was played immediately before, and at the same venue, as the Boys Amateur Championship. However from 1997 it was held as a separate event. In 2021 the match was replaced by a combined Girls and Boys Home Internationals.

A match between Scotland and England boys had been played since 1923 while Ireland and Wales had played a match since 1972.

Format
Each team played the other three teams over three successive days. Each team had 11 players. Each match involved 5 18-hole foursomes in the morning and 10 18-hole singles in the afternoon.

From 1985 to 1995 the contest was played in a knock-out format over two days. England and Scotland had played a boys' international since 1923 and a match between Ireland and Wales had also been played, on the same day, since 1972. These two matches continued to be played, acting as semi-finals, with the two winning teams meeting to decide the winner of the home internationals. The two first-day losers also played each other on the second day.

Results

Source:

Earlier England–Scotland matches
Before the Boys Home Internationals was founded, an annual match had been played between England and Scotland since 1923. It was also played immediately before, and generally at the same venue, as the Boys Amateur Championship.

The first match was held on Monday 27 August 1923 at Dunbar, before the third Boys Amateur Championship. There were 10 singles matches with Scotland winning 6, England 3 with one match halved. Scotland won again in 1924 before England won in 1925 and 1926. The 1926 was reduced to just 8 singles matches. Foursomes matches were added in 1927; the match consisting of four foursomes and eight singles. Scotland won the match 7–5. England won a close match in 1928 but Scotland won 9 of the 11 matches between 1929 and 1939. England only win in the 1930s was in 1934, with the 1935 match being tied. Of the 17 matches up to 1939, Scotland had won 12 with England winning 4 and one match tied.

The contest resumed in 1946 with England winning the first three post-war matches. In 1950, an increase in the number of entries for the Boys Championship meant that the England–Scotland match was held on a Saturday for the first time. It was played on a Monday in 1951 but then became a regular Saturday event. From 1958 to 1966 a match was played between a combined England and Scotland team and a team from the Continent of Europe, the forerunner of the Jacques Léglise Trophy. In 1958 and 1959 this match was played on a Saturday with the England–Scotland match played the day before, a Friday. However, from 1960 to 1966 the order of the matches was reversed, the England–Scotland match returning to the Saturday. From 1965 the format was changed; the match consisting of five foursomes and ten singles.

The Jacques Léglise Trophy was started in 1977 and was played on a Friday, the England–Scotland match continuing to be played on the Saturday.

Source:

Earlier Ireland–Wales matches
The match was first played in 1972 on the same day as the England–Scotland match, the Saturday before the Boys Amateur Championship.

Source:

References

See also
Jacques Léglise Trophy

Team golf tournaments
Amateur golf tournaments
Golf in England
Golf in Ireland
Golf in Scotland
Golf in Wales
R&A championships
Recurring sporting events established in 1985
Recurring sporting events disestablished in 2020